Mireille Richard (born 4 May 1989) is a Swiss ski mountaineer.

Mireille was born and lives in Evionnaz. She started ski mountaineering in 1994, and competed first in the 2003 Diamir race. She has been member of the Swiss team since 2005.

Selected results 
 2005:
 1st (juniors), Trophée des Gastlosen
 2010:
 7th (and 1st in the espoirs ranking), Trophée des Gastlosen (ISMF World Cup), together with Victoria Kreuzer
 2011:
 1st, World Championship, relay, together with Nathalie Etzensperger and Gabrielle Gachet
 4th, World Championship, sprint
 4th, World Championship, team, together with Émilie Gex-Fabry
 6th, World Championship, combination ranking
 7th, World Championship, individual
 2012:
 1st, European Championship, sprint
 1st, European Championship, relay, together with Séverine Pont-Combe and Émilie Gex-Fabry
 10th, European Championship, combination ranking

Pierra Menta 

 2010: 6th, together with Simone Hammer
 2011: 5th, together with Martina Valmassoi
 2012: 3rd, together with Gabrielle Gachet

External links 
 Mireille Richard, Skimountaineering.org

References 

1989 births
Living people
Sportspeople from Valais
Swiss female ski mountaineers
World ski mountaineering champions